Furbo may refer to:
Furbo, Smedjebacken, a village and area in Dalarna, Sweden.
Furbo, Smedjebacken, a village and area in Dalarna, Sweden.
Furbo, County Galway, a village in Ireland.
Furbo, an interactive pet camera developed by the Seattle-based pet tech manufacturer Tomofun.